The Middle East is a geopolitical region commonly encompassing Arabia (including the Arabian Peninsula and Bahrain), Asia Minor (Asian part of Turkey except Hatay Province), East Thrace (European part of Turkey), Egypt, Iran, the Levant (including Ash-Shām and Cyprus), Mesopotamia (modern-day Iraq), and the Socotra Archipelago (a part of Yemen). The term came into widespread usage as a replacement of the term Near East (as opposed to the Far East) beginning in the early 20th century. The term "Middle East" has led to some confusion over its changing definitions, and has been viewed by some to be discriminatory or too Eurocentric. The region includes the vast majority of the territories included in the closely associated definition of Western Asia (including Iran), but without the South Caucasus, and additionally includes all of Egypt (not just the Sinai Region) and all of Turkey (not just the part barring East Thrace).

Most Middle Eastern countries (13 out of 18) are part of the Arab world. The most populous countries in the region are Egypt, Turkey, and Iran, while Saudi Arabia is the largest Middle Eastern country by area. The history of the Middle East dates back to ancient times, with the geopolitical importance of the region being recognized for millennia. Several major religions have their origins in the Middle East, including Judaism, Christianity, and Islam. Arabs constitute the main socioethnic grouping in the region, followed by Turks, Persians, Kurds, Azeris, Copts, Jews, Assyrians, Iraqi Turkmen, Yazidis, and Greek Cypriots.

The Middle East generally has a hot, arid climate, especially in the Arabian and Egyptian regions. Several major rivers provide irrigation to support agriculture in limited areas here, such as the Nile Delta in Egypt, the Tigris and Euphrates watersheds of Mesopotamia, and the basin of the Jordan River that spans most of the Levant. These regions are collectively known as the Fertile Crescent, and comprise the core of what historians had long referred to as the cradle of civilization (a label now applied to multiple regions of the world). Conversely, the Levantine coast and most of Turkey have relatively temperate climates typical of the Mediterranean, with dry summers and cool, wet winters. Most of the countries that border the Persian Gulf have vast reserves of petroleum, with monarchs of the Arabian Peninsula in particular benefiting economically from petroleum exports. Because of the arid climate and heavy reliance on the fossil fuel industry, the Middle East is both a heavy contributor to climate change and a region expected to be severely negatively impacted by it.

Other concepts of the region exist including the broader the Middle East and North Africa (MENA), which includes states of the Maghreb and the Sudan, or the "Greater Middle East" which additionally also includes parts of East Africa, Mauritania, Afghanistan, Pakistan, and sometimes Central Asia and the South Caucasus.

Terminology
The term "Middle East" may have originated in the 1850s in the British India Office. However, it became more widely known when American naval strategist Alfred Thayer Mahan used the term in 1902 to "designate the area between Arabia and India". During this time the British and Russian Empires were vying for influence in Central Asia, a rivalry which would become known as the Great Game. Mahan realized not only the strategic importance of the region, but also of its center, the Persian Gulf. He labeled the area surrounding the Persian Gulf as the Middle East, and said that after Egypt's Suez Canal, it was the most important passage for Britain to control in order to keep the Russians from advancing towards British India. Mahan first used the term in his article "The Persian Gulf and International Relations", published in September 1902 in the National Review, a British journal.

Mahan's article was reprinted in The Times and followed in October by a 20-article series entitled "The Middle Eastern Question," written by Sir Ignatius Valentine Chirol. During this series, Sir Ignatius expanded the definition of Middle East to include "those regions of Asia which extend to the borders of India or command the approaches to India." After the series ended in 1903, The Times removed quotation marks from subsequent uses of the term.

Until World War II, it was customary to refer to areas centered around Turkey and the eastern shore of the Mediterranean as the "Near East", while the "Far East" centered on China, and the Middle East then meant the area from Mesopotamia to Burma, namely the area between the Near East and the Far East. In the late 1930s, the British established the Middle East Command, which was based in Cairo, for its military forces in the region. After that time, the term "Middle East" gained broader usage in Europe and the United States, with the Middle East Institute founded in Washington, D.C. in 1946, among other usage.

The corresponding adjective is Middle Eastern and the derived noun is Middle Easterner.

While non-Eurocentric terms such "Southwest Asia" or "Swasia" has been sparsedly used, the inclusion of an African country, Egypt, in the definition questions the usefulness of using such terms.

Usage and criticism

The description Middle has also led to some confusion over changing definitions. Before the First World War, "Near East" was used in English to refer to the Balkans and the Ottoman Empire, while "Middle East" referred to the Caucasus, Persia, and Arabian lands, and sometimes Afghanistan, India and others. In contrast, "Far East" referred to the countries of East Asia (e.g. China, Japan and Korea).

With the collapse of the Ottoman Empire in 1918, "Near East" largely fell out of common use in English, while "Middle East" came to be applied to the re-emerging countries of the Islamic world. However, the usage "Near East" was retained by a variety of academic disciplines, including archaeology and ancient history, where it describes an area identical to the term Middle East, which is not used by these disciplines (see Ancient Near East).

The first official use of the term "Middle East" by the United States government was in the 1957 Eisenhower Doctrine, which pertained to the Suez Crisis. Secretary of State John Foster Dulles defined the Middle East as "the area lying between and including Libya on the west and Pakistan on the east, Syria and Iraq on the North and the Arabian peninsula to the south, plus the Sudan and Ethiopia." In 1958, the State Department explained that the terms "Near East" and "Middle East" were interchangeable, and defined the region as including only Egypt, Syria, Israel, Lebanon, Jordan, Iraq, Saudi Arabia, Kuwait, Bahrain, and Qatar.

The term Middle East has also been criticised by journalist Louay Khraish and historian Hassan Hanafi for being a Eurocentric and colonialist term.

The Associated Press Stylebook says that Near East formerly referred to the farther west countries while Middle East referred to the eastern ones, but that now they are synonymous. It instructs:
Use Middle East unless Near East is used by a source in a story. Mideast is also acceptable, but Middle East is preferred.

Translations
There are terms similar to Near East and Middle East in other European languages, but since it is a relative description, the meanings depend on the country and are different from the English terms generally. In German the term Naher Osten (Near East) is still in common use (nowadays the term Mittlerer Osten is more and more common in press texts translated from English sources, albeit having a distinct meaning) and in Russian Ближний Восток or Blizhniy Vostok, Bulgarian Близкия Изток, Polish Bliski Wschód or Croatian Bliski istok (meaning Near East in all the four Slavic languages) remains as the only appropriate term for the region. However, some languages do have "Middle East" equivalents, such as the French Moyen-Orient, Swedish Mellanöstern, Spanish Oriente Medio or Medio Oriente, and the Italian Medio Oriente.

Perhaps because of the influence of the Western press, the Arabic equivalent of Middle East (Arabic: الشرق الأوسط  ash-Sharq al-Awsaṭ) has become standard usage in the mainstream Arabic press, comprising the same meaning as the term "Middle East" in North American and Western European usage. The designation, Mashriq, also from the Arabic root for East, also denotes a variously defined region around the Levant, the eastern part of the Arabic-speaking world (as opposed to the Maghreb, the western part). Even though the term originated in the West, apart from Arabic, other languages of countries of the Middle East also use a translation of it. The Persian equivalent for Middle East is خاورمیانه (Khāvar-e miyāneh), the Hebrew is המזרח התיכון (hamizrach hatikhon), the Turkish is Orta Doğu and the Greek is Μέση Ανατολή (Mesi Anatoli).

Countries and territory

Countries and territory usually considered within the Middle East 
Traditionally included within the Middle East are Arabia, Asia Minor, East Thrace, Egypt, Iran, the Levant, Mesopotamia, and the Socotra Archipelago. The region includes 17 UN-recognized countries and one British Overseas Territory. 

a. Jerusalem is the proclaimed capital of Israel, which is disputed, and the actual location of the Knesset, Israeli Supreme Court, and other governmental institutions of Israel. Ramallah is the actual location of the government of Palestine, whereas the proclaimed capital of Palestine is East Jerusalem, which is disputed.
b. Controlled by the Houthis due to the ongoing civil war. Seat of government moved to Aden.

Other definitions of the Middle East

Various concepts are often being paralleled to the Middle East, most notably the Near East, Fertile Crescent, and Levant. The Near East, Fertile Crescent, and Levant are geographical concepts, which refer to large sections of the modern-day Middle East, with the Near East being the closest to the Middle East in its geographical meaning. Due to it primarily being Arabic speaking, the Maghreb region of North Africa is sometimes included.

The countries of the South Caucasus—Armenia, Azerbaijan, and Georgia—are occasionally included in definitions of the Middle East.

The Greater Middle East was a political term coined by the second Bush administration in the first decade of the 21st century, to denote various countries, pertaining to the Muslim world, specifically Afghanistan, Iran, Pakistan, and Turkey. Various Central Asian countries are sometimes also included.

History

The Middle East lies at the juncture of Africa and Eurasia and of the Indian Ocean and the Mediterranean Sea. It is the birthplace and spiritual center of religions such as Christianity, Islam, Judaism, Manichaeism, Yezidi, Druze, Yarsan, and Mandeanism, and in Iran, Mithraism, Zoroastrianism, Manicheanism, and the Baháʼí Faith. Throughout its history the Middle East has been a major center of world affairs; a strategically, economically, politically, culturally, and religiously sensitive area. The region is one of the regions where agriculture was independently discovered, and from the Middle East it was spread, during the Neolithic, to different regions of the world such as Europe, the Indus Valley and Eastern Africa.

Prior to the formation of civilizations, advanced cultures formed all over the Middle East during the Stone Age. The search for agricultural lands by agriculturalists, and pastoral lands by herdsmen meant different migrations took place within the region and shaped its ethnic and demographic makeup.

The Middle East is widely and most famously known as the cradle of civilization. The world's earliest civilizations, Mesopotamia (Sumer, Akkad, Assyria and Babylonia), ancient Egypt and Kish in the Levant, all originated in the Fertile Crescent and Nile Valley regions of the ancient Near East. These were followed by the Hittite, Greek, Hurrian and Urartian civilisations of Asia Minor; Elam, Persia and Median civilizations in Iran, as well as the civilizations of the Levant (such as Ebla, Mari, Nagar, Ugarit, Canaan, Aramea, Mitanni, Phoenicia and Israel) and the Arabian Peninsula (Magan, Sheba, Ubar). The Near East was first largely unified under the Neo Assyrian Empire, then the Achaemenid Empire followed later by the Macedonian Empire and after this to some degree by the Iranian empires (namely the Parthian and Sassanid Empires), the Roman Empire and Byzantine Empire. The region served as the intellectual and economic center of the Roman Empire and played an exceptionally important role due to its periphery on the Sassanid Empire. Thus, the Romans stationed up to five or six of their legions in the region for the sole purpose of defending it from Sassanid and Bedouin raids and invasions.

From the 4th century CE onwards, the Middle East became the center of the two main powers at the time, the Byzantine Empire and the Sassanid Empire. However, it would be the later Islamic Caliphates of the Middle Ages, or Islamic Golden Age which began with the Islamic conquest of the region in the 7th century AD, that would first unify the entire Middle East as a distinct region and create the dominant Islamic Arab ethnic identity that largely (but not exclusively) persists today. The 4 caliphates that dominated the Middle East for more than 600 years were the Rashidun Caliphate, the Umayyad caliphate, the Abbasid caliphate and the Fatimid caliphate. Additionally, the Mongols would come to dominate the region, the Kingdom of Armenia would incorporate parts of the region to their domain, the Seljuks would rule the region and spread Turko-Persian culture, and the Franks would found the Crusader states that would stand for roughly two centuries. Josiah Russell estimates the population of what he calls "Islamic territory" as roughly 12.5 million in 1000 – Anatolia 8 million, Syria 2 million, and Egypt 1.5 million.
From the 16th century onward, the Middle East came to be dominated, once again, by two main powers: the Ottoman Empire and the Safavid dynasty.

The modern Middle East began after World War I, when the Ottoman Empire, which was allied with the Central Powers, was defeated by the British Empire and their allies and partitioned into a number of separate nations, initially under British and French Mandates. Other defining events in this transformation included the establishment of Israel in 1948 and the eventual departure of European powers, notably Britain and France by the end of the 1960s. They were supplanted in some part by the rising influence of the United States from the 1970s onwards.

In the 20th century, the region's significant stocks of crude oil gave it new strategic and economic importance. Mass production of oil began around 1945, with Saudi Arabia, Iran, Kuwait, Iraq, and the United Arab Emirates having large quantities of oil. Estimated oil reserves, especially in Saudi Arabia and Iran, are some of the highest in the world, and the international oil cartel OPEC is dominated by Middle Eastern countries.

During the Cold War, the Middle East was a theater of ideological struggle between the two superpowers and their allies: NATO and the United States on one side, and the Soviet Union and Warsaw Pact on the other, as they competed to influence regional allies. Besides the political reasons there was also the "ideological conflict" between the two systems. Moreover, as Louise Fawcett argues, among many important areas of contention, or perhaps more accurately of anxiety, were, first, the desires of the superpowers to gain strategic advantage in the region, second, the fact that the region contained some two-thirds of the world's oil reserves in a context where oil was becoming increasingly vital to the economy of the Western world [...] Within this contextual framework, the United States sought to divert the Arab world from Soviet influence. Throughout the 20th and 21st centuries, the region has experienced both periods of relative peace and tolerance and periods of conflict particularly between Sunnis and Shiites.

Demographics

Ethnic groups

Arabs constitute the largest ethnic group in the Middle East, followed by various Iranian peoples and then by Turkic peoples (Turkish, Azeris, Syrian Turkmen, and Iraqi Turkmen). Native ethnic groups of the region include, in addition to Arabs, Arameans, Assyrians, Baloch, Berbers, Copts, Druze, Greek Cypriots, Jews, Kurds, Lurs, Mandaeans, Persians, Samaritans, Shabaks, Tats, and Zazas. European ethnic groups that form a diaspora in the region include Albanians, Bosniaks, Circassians (including Kabardians), Crimean Tatars, Greeks, Franco-Levantines, Italo-Levantines, and Iraqi Turkmens. Among other migrant populations are Chinese, Filipinos, Indians, Indonesians, Pakistanis, Pashtuns, Romani, and Afro-Arabs.

Migration
"Migration has always provided an important vent for labor market pressures in the Middle East. For the period between the 1970s and 1990s, the Arab states of the Persian Gulf in particular provided a rich source of employment for workers from Egypt, Yemen and the countries of the Levant, while Europe had attracted young workers from North African countries due both to proximity and the legacy of colonial ties between France and the majority of North African states." 

According to the International Organization for Migration, there are 13 million first-generation migrants from Arab nations in the world, of which 5.8 reside in other Arab countries. Expatriates from Arab countries contribute to the circulation of financial and human capital in the region and thus significantly promote regional development. In 2009 Arab countries received a total of US$35.1 billion in remittance in-flows and remittances sent to Jordan, Egypt and Lebanon from other Arab countries are 40 to 190 per cent higher than trade revenues between these and other Arab countries. In Somalia, the Somali Civil War has greatly increased the size of the Somali diaspora, as many of the best educated Somalis left for Middle Eastern countries as well as Europe and North America.

Non-Arab Middle Eastern countries such as Turkey, Israel and Iran are also subject to important migration dynamics.

A fair proportion of those migrating from Arab nations are from ethnic and religious minorities facing racial and or religious persecution and are not necessarily ethnic Arabs, Iranians or Turks. Large numbers of Kurds, Jews, Assyrians, Greeks and Armenians as well as many Mandeans have left nations such as Iraq, Iran, Syria and Turkey for these reasons during the last century. In Iran, many religious minorities such as Christians, Baháʼís, Jews and Zoroastrians have left since the Islamic Revolution of 1979.

Religions

The Middle East is very diverse when it comes to religions, many of which originated there. Islam is the largest religion in the Middle East, but other faiths that originated there, such as Judaism and Christianity, are also well represented. Christian communities have played a vital role in the Middle East, and they represent 40.5% of Lebanon, where the Lebanese president, half of the cabinet, and half of the parliament follow one of the various Lebanese Christian rites. There are also important minority religions like the Baháʼí Faith, Yarsanism, Yazidism, Zoroastrianism, Mandaeism, Druze, and Shabakism, and in ancient times the region was home to Mesopotamian religions, Canaanite religions, Manichaeism, Mithraism and various monotheist gnostic sects.

Languages
The six top languages, in terms of numbers of speakers, are Arabic, Persian, Turkish, Kurdish, Hebrew and Greek. Arabic and Hebrew represent the Afro-Asiatic language family. Persian, Kurdish and Greek belong to the Indo-European language family. Turkish belongs to Turkic language family. About 20 minority languages are also spoken in the Middle East.

Arabic, with all its dialects, is the most widely spoken language in the Middle East, with Literary Arabic being official in all North African and in most West Asian countries. Arabic dialects are also spoken in some adjacent areas in neighbouring Middle Eastern non-Arab countries. It is a member of the Semitic branch of the Afro-Asiatic languages. Several Modern South Arabian languages such as Mehri and Soqotri are also spoken Yemen and Oman. Another Semitic language such as Aramaic and its dialects are spoken mainly by Assyrians and Mandaeans. There is also an Oasis Berber-speaking community in Egypt where the language is also known as Siwa. It is a non-Semitic Afro-Asiatic language.

Persian is the second most spoken language. While it is primarily spoken in Iran and some border areas in neighbouring countries, the country is one of the region's largest and most populous. It belongs to the Indo-Iranian branch of the family of Indo-European languages. Other Western Iranic languages spoken in the region include Achomi, Daylami, Kurdish dialects, Semmani, Lurish, amongst many others.

The third-most widely spoken language, Turkish, is largely confined to Turkey, which is also one of the region's largest and most populous countries, but it is present in areas in neighboring countries. It is a member of the Turkic languages, which have their origins in East Asia. Another Turkic language, Azerbaijani, is spoken by Azerbaijanis in Iran.

Hebrew is one of the two official languages of Israel, the other being Arabic. Hebrew is spoken and used by over 80% of Israel's population, the other 20% using Arabic.

Greek is one of the two official languages of Cyprus, and the country's main language. Small communities of Greek speakers exist all around the Middle East; until the 20th century it was also widely spoken in Asia Minor (being the second most spoken language there, after Turkish) and Egypt. During the antiquity, Ancient Greek was the lingua franca for many areas of the western Middle East and until the Muslim expansion it was widely spoken there as well. Until the late 11th century, it was also the main spoken language in Asia Minor; after that it was gradually replaced by the Turkish language as the Anatolian Turks expanded and the local Greeks were assimilated, especially in the interior.

English is one of the official languages of Akrotiri and Dhekelia. It is also commonly taught and used as a second language, especially among the middle and upper classes, in countries such as Egypt, Jordan, Iran, Kurdistan, Iraq, Qatar, Bahrain, United Arab Emirates and Kuwait. It is also a main language in some Emirates of the United Arab Emirates. It is also spoken as native language by Jewish immigrants from Anglophone countries (UK, USA, Australia) in Israel and understood widely as second language there.

French is taught and used in many government facilities and media in Lebanon, and is taught in some primary and secondary schools of Egypt and Syria. Maltese, a Semitic language mainly spoken in Europe, is also used by the Franco-Maltese diaspora in Egypt. Also, due to widespread immigration of French Jews to Israel, it is the native language of approximately 200,000 Jews of Israel.

Armenian speakers are also to be found in the region. Georgian is spoken by the Georgian diaspora. 

Russian is spoken by a large portion of the Israeli population, because of emigration in the late 1990s. Russian today is a popular unofficial language in use in Israel; news, radio and sign boards can be found in Russian around the country after Hebrew and Arabic. Circassian is also spoken by the diaspora in the region and by almost all Circassians in Israel who speak Hebrew and English as well. 

The largest Romanian-speaking community in the Middle East is found in Israel, where  Romanian is spoken by 5% of the population.

Bengali, Hindi and Urdu are widely spoken by migrant communities in many Middle Eastern countries, such as Saudi Arabia (where 20–25% of the population is South Asian), the United Arab Emirates (where 50–55% of the population is South Asian), and Qatar, which have large numbers of Pakistani, Bangladeshi and Indian immigrants.

Economy

Middle Eastern economies range from being very poor (such as Gaza and Yemen) to extremely wealthy nations (such as Qatar and UAE). Overall, according to the CIA World Factbook, all nations in the Middle East are maintaining a positive rate of growth.

According to the World Bank's World Development Indicators database published on 1 July 2009, the three largest Middle Eastern economies in 2008 were Turkey ($794,228), Saudi Arabia ($467,601) and Iran ($385,143) in terms of Nominal GDP. Regarding nominal GDP per capita, the highest ranking countries are Qatar ($93,204), the UAE ($55,028), Kuwait ($45,920) and Cyprus ($32,745). Turkey ($1,028,897), Iran ($839,438) and Saudi Arabia ($589,531) had the largest economies in terms of GDP-PPP. When it comes to per capita (PPP)-based income, the highest-ranking countries are Qatar ($86,008), Kuwait ($39,915), the UAE ($38,894), Bahrain ($34,662) and Cyprus ($29,853). The lowest-ranking country in the Middle East, in terms of per capita income (PPP), is the autonomous Palestinian Authority of Gaza and the West Bank ($1,100).

The economic structure of Middle Eastern nations are different in the sense that while some nations are heavily dependent on export of only oil and oil-related products (such as Saudi Arabia, the UAE and Kuwait), others have a highly diverse economic base (such as Cyprus, Israel, Turkey and Egypt). Industries of the Middle Eastern region include oil and oil-related products, agriculture, cotton, cattle, dairy, textiles, leather products, surgical instruments, defence equipment (guns, ammunition, tanks, submarines, fighter jets, UAVs, and missiles). Banking is also an important sector of the economies, especially in the case of UAE and Bahrain.

With the exception of Cyprus, Turkey, Egypt, Lebanon and Israel, tourism has been a relatively undeveloped area of the economy, in part because of the socially conservative nature of the region as well as political turmoil in certain regions of the Middle East. In recent years, however, countries such as the UAE, Bahrain, and Jordan have begun attracting greater numbers of tourists because of improving tourist facilities and the relaxing of tourism-related restrictive policies.

Unemployment is notably high in the Middle East and North Africa region, particularly among young people aged 15–29, a demographic representing 30% of the region's total population. The total regional unemployment rate in 2005, according to the International Labour Organization, was 13.2%, and among youth is as high as 25%, up to 37% in Morocco and 73% in Syria.

Climate change

Gallery

See also

Notes

References

Further reading

 
 
 
 
 
 
 Cleveland, William L., and Martin Bunton. A History Of The Modern Middle East (6th ed. 2018 4th ed. online
 Cressey, George B. (1960). Crossroads: Land and Life in Southwest Asia. Chicago, IL: J.B. Lippincott Co. xiv, 593 pp. ill. with maps and b&w photos.
 Fischbach, ed. Michael R. Biographical encyclopedia of the modern Middle East and North Africa (Gale Group, 2008).
 Freedman, Robert O. (1991). The Middle East from the Iran-Contra Affair to the Intifada, in series, Contemporary Issues in the Middle East. 1st ed. Syracuse, NY: Syracuse University Press. x, 441 pp.  pbk.
 
 Halpern, Manfred. Politics of Social Change: In the Middle East and North Africa (Princeton University Press, 2015).
 Ismael, Jacqueline S., Tareq Y. Ismael, and Glenn Perry. Government and politics of the contemporary Middle East: Continuity and change (Routledge, 2015).
 Lynch, Marc, ed. The Arab Uprisings Explained: New Contentious Politics in the Middle East (Columbia University Press, 2014). p. 352.
 
 Reich, Bernard. Political leaders of the contemporary Middle East and North Africa: a biographical dictionary (Greenwood Publishing Group, 1990).
 Vasiliev, Alexey. Russia’s Middle East Policy: From Lenin to Putin (Routledge, 2018).

External links

 "Middle East – Articles by Region"  – Council on Foreign Relations: "A Resource for Nonpartisan Research and Analysis"
 "Middle East – Interactive Crisis Guide"  – Council on Foreign Relations: "A Resource for Nonpartisan Research and Analysis"
 Middle East Department University of Chicago Library
 Middle East Business Intelligence since 1957: "The leading information source on business in the Middle East" – MEED.com
 Carboun – advocacy for sustainability and environmental conservation in the Middle East
 
 Middle East News from Yahoo! News
 Middle East Business, Financial & Industry News – ArabianBusiness.com

Middle East
Regions of Eurasia
Western Asia
North Africa
Regions of Africa
Articles containing video clips
Eurocentrism